WHAS (840 kHz) is an AM radio station owned by iHeartMedia, Inc. and licensed to Louisville, Kentucky. Its studios are located in the Louisville enclave of Watterson Park, and the transmitter site is in Long Run, in far east Jefferson County. First licensed in July 1922, it is the oldest radio station in Kentucky.

WHAS is a clear channel station, operating around the clock on 840 kHz with 50,000 watts. Its daytime signal can be heard in almost all of central Kentucky, as well as large slices of Ohio and Indiana, providing city-grade coverage as far east as Lexington, as far south as Bowling Green, and as far north as Cincinnati. Secondary coverage extends as far as Nashville, Dayton, and Indianapolis. The nighttime signal can be heard with a good radio in most of the continental United States and much of Canada, and at times in other countries.

Since September 2007 WHAS has also broadcast full-time using the HD Radio IBOC digital radio system, following an initial testing period which started in 2006. HD Radio has since been turned off.  Prior to 1995, WHAS broadcast in C-QUAM AM stereo.

History

The U.S. Department of Commerce, which regulated radio communication at this time, adopted regulations, effective December 1, 1921, that formally established a broadcast service category, designating the wavelength of 360 meters (833 kHz) for "entertainment" broadcasting, and 485 meters (619 kHz) for "market and weather reports". On July 13, 1922, the Courier-Journal and Louisville Times were issued a license for the first broadcasting station in Kentucky, which was assigned the sequentially issued call letters of WHAS, for operation on both the 360- and 485-meter wavelengths. Kentucky was the 45th out of the then-48 states to establish a broadcasting station.

Following a short series of test transmissions, WHAS made its formal debut broadcast on July 18, 1922. On May 16, 1925, the first live broadcast of the Kentucky Derby horse race was made by WHAS and also by WGN in Chicago. The call of the Derby featured an announcer who watched from the windows of one of the famous twin spires of Churchill Downs.

On November 11, 1928, the Federal Radio Commission's (FRC) General Order 40 made a major reallocation of the broadcasting frequencies. This introduced a category known as "clear channel stations" that included WHAS, which was assigned exclusive nationwide use of 820 kHz. On May 15, 1932, WHAS changed from being a National Broadcasting Company (NBC-Red) affiliate and joined the Columbia Broadcasting System (CBS). At that time, WHAS operated with 10,000 watts of power, but the output was soon increased to 25,000 watts as authorized by the FRC. On March 29, 1941, a second major reallocation, as part of the implementation of the North American Regional Broadcasting Agreement, resulted in WHAS's clear channel frequency being shifted to its current assignment of 840 kHz.

The station was originally part of the local media empire ruled by the Bingham family, which also published Louisville Courier-Journal and Louisville Times (now owned by the Gannett Company and merged in 1987) and operated television station WHAS-TV (which, following several mergers and transactions in subsequent years, is now owned by Tegna). WHAS and its FM sister station, WAMZ (the former WHAS-FM) were acquired by Clear Channel Communications (which, as iHeartMedia, continues to own the stations to this day) in 1986 as part of the breakup of the Bingham family's media properties.

Programming evolution
WHAS modernized in the early 1970s from an old-line MOR music outlet into an early form of Hot Adult Contemporary music format, featuring adult-appeal Top 40 hits and rock oldies; one longtime slogan was "Good and Gold" (as in "good music", or adult contemporary, and "golden" oldies). For a time in the 1980s, it was also the Louisville affiliate for Casey Kasem's American Top 40. The station continued to feature a full-service Hot AC format through the 1980s (and was the last 50 kW AM station with a full-time AC format), and by 1995, most of the remaining music programming was oldies-based; this made WHAS one of the last 50,000-watt clear-channel radio stations to feature music programming on a regular basis.

Recent history
Today the station features The Clay Travis and Buck Sexton Show, The Mark Levin Show (delayed by 2 hours), the last two hours of the national broadcast of Ground Zero, and Coast to Coast AM (live) on its daily lineup. Some other personalities on the weekday lineup have included Terry Meiners on "The Terry Meiners Show" and Lachlan McLean on "SportsTalk 840".

The late morning slot (9 a.m. to noon) has seen two changes in recent years. Francene Cucinello hosted "The Francene Show" until her death on January 15, 2010; she was replaced that summer by Mandy Connell. In turn, Connell left in August 2013 to become the morning host on fellow iHeartMedia (then Clear Channel) station KHOW in Denver; her last show on WHAS was on August 9. For several months after her move, Connell provided daily one-minute commentaries, known as "Mandy Minutes", to WHAS. Connell's slot was filled by Leland Conway, previously a talk radio host in Lexington, Kentucky and most recently Richmond, Virginia, whose show began airing on September 16.

Significant changes came to the afternoon and evening lineup in the first half of 2015. In February, McLean announced he would leave WHAS on May 15 and move to Charlotte, North Carolina, where his wife took a corporate position with the Cedar Fair amusement park company. In April, it was confirmed that Sports Talk 840 would end when McLean left WHAS. Effective May 18, Meiners' show was cut back by an hour, ending at 6:00 instead of 7:00. The 6–8 time slot was filled by Connell, who returned to the Louisville market with a locally focused talk show (although it broadcasts from KHOW's studios) until February 2016. Then longtime fill-in host Mary Walter took over as the permanent host and continued the local focused format. The Mark Levin Show moved to the 8–11 slot, being delayed by two hours instead of three, and an extra hour of Ground Zero was picked up.

Weekend programming includes The Dave Ramsey Show, The Weekend With Joe Pags (Joe Pagliarulo), The Ric Edelman Show, The Larry Kudlow Show, The Mutual Fund Show (co-hosted by Adam Bold), and Handel on the Law. At the same time as the spring 2015 lineup changes, WHAS replaced The Bill Cunningham Show in its Sunday night lineup with The John and Leah Show, a syndicated weekly news review show hosted by former WHAS personality John Ziegler and Leah Brandon.

Sports programming
WHAS was the original radio home to locally produced coverage of American Basketball Association games involving the Kentucky Colonels during that league's 1967–1976 existence. 
 
WHAS is Louisville's primary home station for the University of Kentucky athletic broadcasts from the UK Sports Network, carrying Wildcats football and men's basketball games. Previously, it had been the flagship for U of L Sports Network coverage of Louisville Cardinals football and basketball, and still serves as the Cardinals' effective flagship station when there is no conflict with Wildcats games. When there is a conflict with Wildcats games, WKRD broadcasts Cardinals games.

Starting in 2015, iHeart media began broadcasting Louisville City FC games.

Public service
WHAS is the flagship radio station for the annual WHAS Crusade for Children telethon. The station also broadcasts The Moral Side of the News, one of the oldest public affairs programs in American broadcasting, dating back to the 1940s. The show has also been shown on WHAS-TV since the 1950s. The show's panel of clergy members have been involved in distributing the proceeds of the Crusade for Children among local charities since the telethon's beginning.

WHAS radio has solidified its reputation over the years as a leader in coverage of crisis situations, particularly severe weather.

https://babel.hathitrust.org/cgi/pt?id=mdp.39015003843847&view=1up&seq=217 1937 FLOOD

During the Ohio River flood of 1937, the station gained nationwide notice for its coverage of the disaster, which included broadcasting Louisville flood bulletins over the facilities of WSM in Nashville after Louisville authorities were forced to cut electrical power to the city because of the rising flood waters (thus forcing WHAS' own signal off the air). During the 1937 Flood the station aired 115,000 messages. WHAS returned the favor in 1950 by helping WSM-TV establish television service in Middle Tennessee with a microwave signal link from WHAS-TV.

On the afternoon of April 3, 1974, Louisville was hit by an F4 tornado that developed during the 1974 Super Outbreak. WHAS broke away from regular programming to track the storm as it passed through the Louisville metropolitan area. In the hours immediately following the storm, the station delivered important information about what areas had been directly impacted by the storms, and traffic reporter Dick Gilbert followed the tornado in his helicopter, reporting on the damage as he flew at a safe distance behind the storm. The station stayed with continuous coverage of the disaster in Louisville and across the state of Kentucky and the southern portion of Indiana until well into the early morning hours of April 4. For their efforts, the station's personnel earned thanks from then-Kentucky Governor Wendell Ford and President Richard Nixon.

WHAS continued to provide valuable severe weather coverage in the 1990s. On January 17, 1994, a record overnight snowstorm paralyzed the city and much of the state of Kentucky. WHAS had round the clock updates and closings information for nearly a week. On May 28, 1996, another tornado outbreak occurred in Kentuckiana and the station suspended its election coverage that night to cover the storm.

Notable former on-air personalities
 Randy Atcher, children's host, cowboy singer
 Ford Bond, network announcer in the era of old-time radio
 Foster Brooks, show host and emergency reporter, 1937 Flood coverage
 Gary Burbank, afternoon DJ
 David Dick, newscaster, later with WHAS-TV and from 1966 to 1985 CBS News
 Joe Donovan, overnight DJ, show host (1977–1998)
 Dick Gilbert, helicopter traffic reporter (1970–1984), received national recognition for broadcasting live coverage of the April 3, 1974, Louisville tornado
 Cawood Ledford, sports
 Lachlan McLean, sports; final host of Sports Talk 840
 Don McNeill, national morning radio host
 Milton Metz, talk show host, notable for live broadcast after April 3, 1974, tornado that shared information about the aftermath.
 Hugh Smith
 Mary Walter, talk show host
 Fred Wiche, Farm & Garden Director, "The Weekend Gardner" (1979–1998)
 John Ziegler, talk show host

See also
 WHAS-TV
 List of radio stations in Kentucky

References

Bibliography
  (about WHAS and early radio in general)

External links

FCC History Cards for WHAS (covering 1927-1980)
Website of recently deceased mid-morning host Francene Cucinello
WHAS-AM clips archive from LKYRadio

HAS
News and talk radio stations in the United States
Radio stations established in 1922
American Basketball Association flagship radio stations
1922 establishments in Kentucky
IHeartMedia radio stations
Kentucky Wildcats football
Kentucky Wildcats men's basketball
Clear-channel radio stations
Radio stations licensed before 1923 and still broadcasting